Ajit Singhvi is philanthropist of Indian origin and a management expert based in London. He is best known as professorial chair donor at IIT Roorkee and IIT Madras. Together with Abdullahi Adamu and Ernest Shonekan, Singhvi received attention for campaigning with letters to the presidency for a shift in Nigeria's economic recovery model in 1993.

Career
Dr Ajit Singhvi has worked in several countries with many multinational companies such as BICC (British Insulated Cables company London), GEC Alsthom (MD), Leyland Nigeria (MD), NES group of companies, CarnaudMetalbox, Aditya Birla Group (President - WCM) and Argo Pantes Group.

Dr Singhvi is the alumnus of Harvard Business School, Manchester Business School, School of Engineering-Middlesex University, Japan Institute of Plant Management, Ashridge Management College, Institute of Chartered Accountants, and Chartered Institute of Management Accountants. Dr Singhvi had closely worked with professor David A. Garvin (12 May 1952 – 30 April 2017) an American economist at Harvard Business School.

He was awarded two research degrees Doctor of Philosophy and Doctor of Engineering.

Philanthropy
Singhvi made major donations to education and women empowerment in India, and endowed two professorial chairs at IIT Roorkee and IIT Madras. He also donated large amounts to Loyola Institute of Business Administration (LIBA) in Chennai, Institute of Cost Accountants Kolkata and Mohanlal Sukhadia University in Udaipur among others. Singhvi has mooted the idea of ISR (Individual Social Responsibility) as a mirror age of CSR to support and promote philanthropic activities in the society.

In February 2019, Loyola Institute of Business Administration named a micro Centre for Good Governance after Ajit Singhvi.

He is the founder and promoter of the Ajit Singhvi Education and Training Trust.

Books
 Fast Tracking to Managerial & CEO Roles, 2019,

References

Harvard Business School alumni
Alumni of the Manchester Business School
People from Rajasthan
Indian philanthropists
People from Jodhpur
Year of birth missing (living people)
Living people